Michael Jordan: Chaos in the Windy City is a 1994 side-scrolling action video game developed by Electronic Arts and published by Ocean for the Super Nintendo Entertainment System. The game was released in North America on November 21, 1994 and in Europe on March 11, 1995. A Sega Genesis version was planned, but never released.

Gameplay 

The game played much like other two-dimensional platform games of its time, collecting keys and defeating enemies with a variety of different techniques. The player controls Michael Jordan on a quest to save the rest of the players for an All-Star charity game, who have all been kidnapped. The player attacks enemies using different basketballs, each with its own ability; for example, the freeze ball can freeze the ground and create a slippery surface, the bomb ball makes a large explosion, and so on. The player must find keys throughout the game to unlock different doors and rescue teammates. Michael can also slam dunk for a secondary attack. This is also used to activate power-up baskets and various checkpoints along the way.

Plot 

A little before the Scottie Pippen charity game, Michael Jordan's teammates are abducted by mad scientist Maximus Cranium. The protagonist must save them before it is too late.

Development

Reception 
GamePro gave the game a positive review. While they acknowledged that the blatant product placement is annoying, and criticized the controls as extremely difficult, they gave the game a positive recommendation based on its varied gameplay and "intense, complex levels". Nintendo Power commented on the game stating that "Michael has some cool moves" and noted the game's "good graphics" and that the "play control seems loose at times" and that it had "generic platform game enemies with simple AI". A reviewer for Next Generation gave it two out of five stars, commenting that "the backgrounds are redundant, the mazes repetitious, and the action never improves for 24 mind-numbing levels. Kudos for the original concept, but again, Jordan should have stuck with basketball." Super Play gave the game an overall score of 83/100, noting the game having many levels and sub levels, in which he concluded: "A high-quality platform game, hidden under a bizarre plot and a great deal of licensing. A pretty rare thing these days and all the more laudable for it. Hooray!"

In September 1997, Nintendo Power had 12 staff members vote for the ten worst games of all time, with Michael Jordan: Chaos in the Windy City  placed at seventh worst. The article said the game was not too poor, but was a waste of a license.

See also 
 Shaq Fu
 Barkley Shut Up and Jam!
 Slam City with Scottie Pippen

References

External links 
 

1994 video games
Platform games
Super Nintendo Entertainment System games
Super Nintendo Entertainment System-only games
Video games set in Chicago
Cancelled Sega Genesis games
Cultural depictions of Michael Jordan
Video games based on real people
Video games scored by David Whittaker
Video games developed in the United States
Video games featuring black protagonists